The 1981 Idaho State Bengals football team represented Idaho State University as a member of the Big Sky Conference during the 1981 NCAA Division I-AA football season. The Bengals were led by second-year head coach Dave Kragthorpe and played their home games at the ASISU MiniDome, later renamed Holt Arena, an indoor venue on campus in Pocatello, Idaho. Quarterbacked by senior Mike Machurek, the Bengals won the Big Sky championship with a 6–1 record and were 9–1 overall in the regular season. In the eight-team NCAA Division I-AA playoffs, they won two home playoff games, then won their only national championship to date in the Pioneer Bowl played in Wichita Falls, Texas. Idaho State defeated , 34–23, in the title game to finish the season with a 12–1 record.

Schedule

The regular season finale against Weber State went to triple overtime. The Big Sky introduced overtime for conference games the previous season, and this was its first-ever usage.

Roster

NFL Draft
Two Bengal seniors were selected in the 1982 NFL Draft, which lasted twelve rounds (334 selections).

References

Idaho State
Idaho State Bengals football seasons
NCAA Division I Football Champions
Big Sky Conference football champion seasons
Idaho State Bengals football